Oliver Jack Wright Rogers (born 28 August 1998) is an English former first-class cricketer.

Rogers was born at Richmond in August 1998. He was educated at Eton College, before going up to St Edmund Hall, Oxford. While studying at Oxford, he made two appearances in first-class cricket for Oxford University against Cambridge University in The University Matches of 2018 and 2019, scoring 13 runs and taking a single wicket.

References

External links

1998 births
Living people
People from Richmond, London
People educated at Eton College
Alumni of St Edmund Hall, Oxford
English cricketers
Oxford University cricketers